

1962 
 Diena bez vakara, Māris Rudzītis

1963 
 Jolanta, Vladimirs Gorikers
 Mājiņa kāpās, Arkady Koltsaty and Anatoly Markelov
 Uz Trases, Rostislavs Gorjajevs

1964 
 Cara līgava, Vladimirs Gorikers
 Cielaviņas armija, Aleksandrs Leimanis
 Divi, Mihails Bogins
 Hipokrāta zvērests, Ada Neretniece
 Kapteinis Nulle, Leonīds Leimanis
 Līdz rudenim vēl tālu, Aloizs Brenčs
 Sūtņu sazvērestība, Nikolai Rozantsev
 Tobago maina kursu, Aleksandrs Leimanis

1966 
 Noktirne, Rostislavs Gorjajevs
 Pēdējais blēdis, Vadim Mass and Jan Ebner
 Purva bridējs, Leonīds Leimanis
 Rīta migla, Imants Krenbergs
 I Remember Everything, Richard, Rolands Kalniņš

1967 
 Kapteiņa Enriko pulkstenis, Jānis Streičs
 , Māris Rudzītis
 Kad lietus un vējš sitas logā, Aloizs Brenčs
 Four White Shirts/Breathe Deeply (Elpojiet dziļi), Rolands Kalniņš

1968 
 Ilgās dienas rīts, Ada Neretniece
 24-25 neatgriežas, Aloizs Brenčs
 Mērnieku laiki, Voldemārs Pūce
 Ceļa zīmes, Oļģerts Dunkers
 , Leonīds Leimanis

1969 
 Līvsalas zēni, Jānis Streičs
 Trīskārtēja pārbaude, Aloizs Brenčs
 Stari stiklā, Imants Krenbergs
 Baltās kāpas, Sergey Tarasov

1970 
 The Devil's Servants (Vella kalpi), Aleksandrs Leimanis
 Šauj manā vietā, Jānis Streičs
 Klāvs Mārtiņa dēls, Oļģerts Dunkers
 Karalienes bruņinieks, Rolands Kalniņš
 Vārnu ielas republika, Ada Neretniece

1971 
 Pilsēta zem liepām, A. Brenčs
 Meldru mežs, Ē. Lācis
 In the Shadow of Death (Nāves ēnā), Gunārs Piesis
 Kara ceļa mantinieki, V. Krūmiņš
 Tauriņdeja, O. Dunkers
 Apprecējās vecītis ar večiņu savu, G. Arazjans
 Salātiņš
 Egle rudzu laukā, I. Krenbergs

1972 
 Kapteinis Džeks, A. Neretniece
 Peterss, A. Tarasovs
 Vella kalpi vella dzirnavās, A. Leimanis
 Ceplis, R. Kalniņš

1973 
 Šahs briljantu karalienei, A. Brenčs
 Pieskāriens, R. Gorjajevs
 Dāvana vientuļai sievietei, Ē. Lācis
 Pūt, vējiņi!, Gunārs Piesis
 Pilsētas atslēgas, I. Krenbergs
 Gaisma tuneļa galā, A. Brenčs
 Dunduriņš, B. Ružs
 Uzbrukums slepenpolicijai, O. Dunkers

1974 
 Uzticamais draugs Sančo, Jānis Streičs
 Apple in the River (Ābols upē), A. Freimanis
 Motociklu vasara, U. Brauns
 Melnā vēža spīlēs, A. Leimanis

1975 
 My Frivolous Friend (Mans draugs – nenopietns cilvēks), Jānis Streičs
 Paradīzes atslēgas, A. Brenčs
 Parunā ar mani, B. Veldre

1976 
 The Arrows of Robin Hood, S. Tarasovs
 Ezera sonāte, Gunārs Cilinskis, Varis Brasla
 Šīs bīstamās balkona durvis, Dz. Ritenberga
 Liekam būt, A. Brenčs
 Ģimenes melodrāma, B. Frumins
 Zobena ēnā, I. Krenbergs

1977 
 Zem apgāztā mēness, Ē. Lācis
 Atspulgs ūdenī, A. Rozenbergs
 Vīrietis labākajos gados, O. Dunkers
 Kļūstiet mana sievasmāte, K. Marsons
 Dāvanas pa telefonu, A. Brenčs
 Puika, A. Freimanis

1978 
 Tavs dēls, G. Piesis
 Vīru spēles brīvā dabā, R. Kalniņš, Gunārs Piesis
 Tāpēc, ka esmu Aivars Līdaks, B. Veldre
 Pavasara ceļazīmes, Varis Brasla
 Rallijs, A. Brenčs
 Aiz stikla durvīm, O. Dunkers

1979 
 Nakts bez putniem, G. Cilinskis
 Atklātā pasaule, A. Leimanis
 Trīs minūšu lidojums, Dz. Ritenberga
 Agrā rūsa, G. Cilinskis

1980 
 Novēli man lidojumam nelabvēlīgu laiku, Varis Brasla
 Spāņu variants, Ē. Lācis
 Vakara variants, Ē. Lācis
 Ja nebūtu šī skuķa, R. Pīks

1981 
 Laikmeta griežos, Gunārs Piesis
 Izmeklēšanā noskaidrots, A. Neretniece
 Atcerēties vai aizmirst, Jānis Streičs
 Spēle, A. Krievs
 Tarāns, G. Cilinskis
 A Limousine the Colour of Midsummer's Eve (Limuzīns Jāņu nakts krāsā), Jānis Streičs

1982 
 Tereona galva, Varis Brasla
 Lietus blūzs, O. Dunkers
 Pats garākais salmiņš, Dz. Ritenberga
 Īsa pamācība mīlēšanā, I. Krenbergs
 Svešās kaislības, Jānis Streičs

1983 
 Vilkatis Toms, Ē. Lācis
 , O. Dunkers
 Šāviens mežā, R. Pīks
 Parāds mīlestībā, Varis Brasla
 Fronte tēva pagalmā, Ē. Lācis

1984 
 Aveņu vīns, A. Krievs
 Vajadzīga soliste, G. Zemels
 Kad bremzes netur, G. Cilinskis

1985 
 Dubultslazds, A. Brenčs
 Tikšanās uz Piena ceļa, Jānis Streičs
 Sprīdītis, Gunārs Piesis
 Pēdējā indulgence, A. Neretniece
 Emil's Mischiefs (Emīla nedarbi), Varis Brasla

1986 
 Dubultnieks, R. Pīks
 Apbraucamais ceļš, Ē. Lācis
 Bailes, G. Cilinskis
 Kroņa numurs, I. Krenbergs
 Aizaugušā grāvī viegli krist, Jānis Streičs
 Is It Easy to Be Young? (Vai viegli būt jaunam?), Juris Podnieks

1987 
 Svītas cilvēks, A. Rozenbergs
 Fotogrāfija ar sievieti un mežakuili, A. Krievs
 Apstākļu sakritība, V. Beinerte
 Dīvainā mēnesgaisma, G. Cilinskis
 Ja mēs to visu pārcietīsim, Rolands Kalniņš

1988 
 Viktorija, O. Dunkers
 Viss kārtībā, O. Rozenbergs
 Sižeta pagrieziens, P. Krilovs
 Māja bez izejas, Dz. Ritenberga

1989 
 Šausmu dziesma, Jānis Streičs
 Latvieši!?, G. Zemels
 Cilvēka dienas, J. Paškēvičs

1990 
 Es Esmu Latvietis, Ansis Epners - Lielais Kristaps best documentary award (director's second LK best doc award)

See also 
List of Latvian films before 1962
List of Latvian films
Lielais Kristaps national film festival/awards in Riga, Latvia

References